American Idol Season 5: Encores is compilation album released on May 23, 2006 and contains one cover song from each of the top 12 finalists during season 5 of the television show American Idol. It is the only American Idol album that does not feature an ensemble track by all the contestants, and is the first year in which several individual finalists made the popular music charts. The album sold over 154,000 units in its first week, according to Nielsen SoundScan. It debuted at number three on the Billboard 200, behind the Disney Channel Original Movie's High School Musical Soundtrack and the Dixie Chicks' Taking the Long Way, thus becoming the best-selling debut any American Idol compilation disk. It was also number two on Top Soundtracks, number four on Top Digital Albums and number six on Top Internet.

With five albums in the Top 10, American Idol became the most successful soundtrack franchise of any motion picture or television program, beating out Star Wars.  This Season 5 album sold 381,075 copies by September 2, 2006.

Track listing

 "What About Love" (Heart) – 3:45 Melissa McGhee
 "Superstition" (Stevie Wonder) – 3:54 Bucky Covington
 "I'm Every Woman" (Chaka Khan) – 3:44 Mandisa
 "Wanted Dead or Alive" (Bon Jovi) – 4:33 Chris Daughtry
 "Father Figure" (George Michael) – 5:46 Ace Young
 "Takin' It to the Streets" (Doobie Brothers) – 3:39 Taylor Hicks
 "Signed, Sealed, Delivered I'm Yours" (Stevie Wonder) – 2:55 Lisa Tucker
 "Walkin' After Midnight" (Patsy Cline) – 2:59 Kellie Pickler
 "Moody's Mood for Love" (James Moody) – 3:13 Elliott Yamin
 "Think" (Aretha Franklin) – 2:45 Katharine McPhee
 "Midnight Train to Georgia" (Gladys Knight & the Pips) – 3:33 Paris Bennett
 "When I Fall in Love" (Doris Day) – 3:07 Kevin Covais

Personnel
 Cheche Alara – keyboards
 Loren Gold – keyboards
 Tommy Barbarella – organ, keyboards
 Derek Bramble – organ, bass, organ, producer, engineer
 Johnny Britt – trumpet, horn arrangements
 Tom Ralls – trombone
 Derrick Edmondson – saxophone
 Michael Fell – harmonica
 Rob "Fonksta" Bacon – guitar
 Michael Herring – acoustic guitar
 Eamon Ryland – pedal steel, bottleneck guitar
 Greg Suran – guitar
 Eric Gorfain – violin
 Daphne Chen – violin
 Leah Katz – viola
 Richard Dodd – cello
 Dorian Crozier – percussion, drums, engineer, associate producer, drum programming
 Ramon Yslas – percussion
 Mabvuto Carpenter – backing vocals
 Belle Johnson – backing vocals
 Mika Lett – backing vocals
Abraham McDonald- backing vocals
 Michael Anderson – bass, backing vocals, engineer, associate producer, production coordination
 Stephen Lu – orchestration
 Craig Burbidge – engineer, mixing
 Colin Miller – mixing
 David Kutch – mastering

Charts

Weekly charts

Year-end charts

References

American Idol compilation series
2006 compilation albums
2006 soundtrack albums